The Nuffield Orthopaedic Centre (NOC) is an internationally renowned orthopaedic hospital, with strong affiliations to the University of Oxford. It provides routine and specialist orthopaedic surgery, plastic surgery and rheumatology services to the people of Oxfordshire. Specialist services, such as the treatment of osteomyelitis and bone tumours, and the rehabilitation of those with limb amputation, congenital deficiency and neurological disabilities, are provided for patients from across the UK and abroad. It is managed by the Oxford University Hospitals NHS Foundation Trust.

History
Funded by a donation from Mrs. Hannah Wingfield, the hospital began work as the Wingfield Convalescent Centre in 1872. During the First World War, it was a military hospital and was expanded by building a fresh air annexe of wooden buildings.

By 1929, the Wingfield Morris Hospital badly needed rebuilding and Lord Nuffield, then Sir William Morris, donated £70,000 to build new nurses' quarters, seven new wards and a massage department. In recognition of Morris' contribution, the hospital became the Wingfield-Morris Orthopaedic Hospital in 1930. In 1936, Lord Nuffield announced a further gift to Oxford University Medical School which created five clinical chairs, and Professor Gathorne Robert Girdlestone became the first Professor of Orthopaedic Surgery in 1937.

During the Second World War the hospital was controlled by the War Office. In 1948, it was designated as a regional orthopaedic centre and in 1950 it was renamed the Nuffield Orthopaedic Centre. Thanks among others to the appointments in 1949, of Josep Trueta and in 1966, of Robert Duthie, the centre established its prestige and international reputation. Duthie championed its independence and on 1 April 1991 the Nuffield Orthopaedic Centre became an NHS Trust hospital.

Research
The Oxford University Hospitals NHS Foundation Trust is a member of the Oxford Research and Development Consortium. The research activities within the consortium are divided into fifteen collaborative research groups (CRGs). The NOC belongs to the musculo-skeletal group, which covers research activities in the fields of orthopaedics, rheumatology, metabolic medicine, neurological and functional rehabilitation and physiotherapy and have close links and collaboration with the University of Oxford and Oxford Brookes University.

Nuffield Professors of Orthopaedic Surgery
The following is a list of Nuffield Professors of Orthopaedic Surgery:
 1937–1940 Gathorne Robert Girdlestone
 1940–1948 Herbert John Seddon
 1949–1966 Josep Trueta
 1966–1992 Robert Duthie
 1992–2001 John Kenwright
 2001–present Andrew J. Carr

See also
 List of hospitals in England

References

External links
 Oxford University Hospitals NHS Trust
 Nuffield Department of Orthopaedics, Rheumatology and Musculoskeletal Sciences, University of Oxford
 Statutory Instrument 1990 No. 2434 The Nuffield Orthopaedic Centre National Health Service Trust (Establishment) Order 1990

1872 establishments in England
NHS hospitals in England
Specialist hospitals in England
Orthopedic surgical procedures
Hospitals in Oxford
Hospitals established in 1872